Kirari (Sparkling in English) is Dazzle Vision's fifth overall release, containing 12 songs. Kirari dropped on June 3, 2011 by Human Noise records. To date, Kirari is Dazzle Vision's most successful album, topping HMV's charts.

Style
While Dazzle Vision is well known for creating a new mood and style for each album, Kirari is said to be all these influences put into a blender. The album opens up with a gut-wrenching power ballad with screamo undertones and heavy riffs not typical of the usual power ballad. From there this record bounces between alternative metal, rock, and post-hardcore vibes.  The LP also showcases the softer side of Dazzle Vision much like their previous album Crystal Children, clashing pop and rock into tunes such as "Continue" and "Divided".

Music videos
Dazzle Vision made two music videos for this album. The two songs were "Like I'm Not Real" and "Kirari",  both different in setup and style. The music videos were produced by Human Noise Records. "Kirari" was released on April 14, 2011, the same day that the single was released on iTunes Japan. "Like I'm Not Real" was released on June 3, 2011, as promotion for the album itself. The other two singles, "Continue" and "Reason", were not made into music videos because of the band's tour with Evanescence during their Japan Tour in 2012.

Track listing

References

2011 albums
Dazzle Vision albums